The 1982–83 Buffalo Sabres season was the 13th season for the National Hockey League franchise that was established on May 22, 1970.

Offseason

Regular season

Final standings

Schedule and results

Playoffs
Sabres defeat the Montreal Canadiens in the Adams Division Semi-finals, in a three game sweep.

They lose to the Boston Bruins in the Adams Division finals, three games to four.

Player statistics

Awards and records

Transactions

Draft picks
Buffalo's draft picks at the 1982 NHL Entry Draft held at the Montreal Forum in Montreal, Quebec.

Farm teams

See also
1982–83 NHL season

References

Buffalo Sabres seasons
Buffalo
Buffalo
Buffalo
Buffalo